Assaming Mae (born 13 June 1988) is a Thai retired professional footballer who played as a midfielder.

International career

In July, 2011 Assaming debuted for Thailand in a friendly match against Myanmar.

International

References

External links
 Profile at Goal

1988 births
Living people
Assaming Mae
Assaming Mae
Association football midfielders
Assaming Mae
Assaming Mae
Assaming Mae
Assaming Mae
Assaming Mae